Katja Husen (12 June 1976 – 28 June 2022) was a German biologist and politician. A member of Alliance 90/The Greens, she was speaker of the party's youth organisation, Green Youth, and served in the Hamburg Parliament from 2004 to 2008. She was CEO of the Centre for Molecular Neurobiology Hamburg.

Early life and education 
Husen was born in Istanbul, Turkey, on 12 June 1976, where she mostly lived until age six because of her father's job. She attended schools in Kiel, including one exchange year in Portland, Oregon. After she graduated with an Abitur in 1995, she studied biology at the Technische Universität Braunschweig and the Vrije Universiteit Amsterdam, graduating with a Diplom in 2001.

Political career 
In 1997, Husen joined the Alliance 90/The Greens (GAL) party. She was speaker of the party's youth organisation, Green Youth, from 1998 to 2000. She acted as a member of the party board of the Green Party in Hamburg between 2001 and 2002. Elected to the federal party board in 2002, she served as its speaker in matters of women (frauenpolitische Sprecherin) until 2006. In 2004 she was re-elected as a member of the federal party board over Anja Hajduk, the then provincial chair of the Hamburg branch of the Green Party and member of the Bundestag (German Parliament).

She served in the Hamburg Parliament from 2004 to 2008. She was speaker for health politics of the GAL fraction, and a member of the budget committee, the health committee and the committee of consumer protection, and a substitute member of the science committee. She represented her parliamentary group in sub-committees for information and communication technology and administrative modernisation as well as for public service and human resources. She was not elected for the following term. In 2013 she was a candidate for the Bundestag representing Hamburg Wandsbek, but was not elected. In May 2019, when a new  took office in the borough diet of Eimsbüttel, it was suggested that she be elected as the borough's municipal councillor in replacement for a politician of the Social Democratic Party (SPD). She collected only 25 votes, one short of the necessary 26 votes.

Professional career 
She became CEO of the medical centre's Centre for Molecular Neurobiology of the University Medical Center Hamburg-Eppendorf in 2009. and from 2012 she was also the CEO of the centre for dental health (Zahn-, Mund- und Kieferheilkunde).

Personal life 
Husen suffered head injuries from a fall off her bicycle in Bayrischzell, Bavaria, on 26 June 2022, while participating with her partner in the 29th Rosenheimer Radmarathon. She died from her injuries on 28 June at a hospital. She was 46 years old.

References

External links
 
 Katja Husen jimdofree.com
 Katja Husen Results coachcox.co.uk
 Zum Tod von Katja Husen (in German) gruene-hamburg.de

1976 births
2022 deaths
21st-century German women politicians
Deaths from falls
Road incident deaths in Germany
21st-century German biologists
German people of Turkish descent
Alliance 90/The Greens politicians
Members of the Hamburg Parliament
Technical University of Braunschweig alumni
Vrije Universiteit Amsterdam alumni
Politicians from Istanbul
21st-century German politicians
Cycling road incident deaths
German women biologists
21st-century German women scientists